The Tortello amaro di Castel Goffredo ("Castel Goffredo's bitter tortello") is a type of stuffed pasta like ravioli and recognized traditional food product of the Lombardy region, typical of the Castel Goffredo in the province of Mantua.

It is named for the presence of balsamita filling, an aromatic herb called locally 'bitter herb'. The other filling ingredients are herbs, parmesan cheese, bread crumbs, eggs, nutmeg, sage, onion, garlic and salt. Preparing fresh pasta is still a traditional recipe with 10 eggs per kg of flour. About the film obtained is the filling, folding and closing hand, to get well for tortello characteristically flattened triangular.

Once cooked in salt water, the tortelli served with sprinkled with parmesan cheese and a tablespoon of melted butter flavored with sage.

Annually, in the third week of June, in Castel Goffredo, there is the traditional "Feast of the Tortello amaro of Castel Goffredo."

See also
 

Types of pasta
Castel Goffredo